Severn Stars are an English netball team based at the University of Worcester and the University of Gloucestershire. The team is named after the River Severn, which runs through Worcester and Gloucester, the home cities of the two universities. Severn Stars were formed in 2016 and since 2017 their senior team has played in the Netball Superleague.

History

New franchise
In June 2016 it was announced that Severn Stars, together with Wasps Netball and Scottish Sirens, would be one of three new franchises that would join the Netball Superleague for the 2017 season. Severn Stars were formed as a partnership between the University of Worcester and the University of Gloucestershire. They subsequently appointed Anita Navin and Pamela Cookey as directors of netball and Mo'onia Gerrard as their first head coach. On 18 February 2017, with a team that included Josie Janz-Dawson and Eleanor Cardwell, Severn Stars made their Netball Superleague debut in an away game against Surrey Storm, losing 58–40.

Notable players

2023 squad

Internationals

 Ama Agbeze
 Eleanor Cardwell
 Jodie Gibson

 Ashleigh Brazill

 Jodi-Ann Ward

 Towera Vinkhumbo

 Liana Leota

 Maryka Holtzhausen
 Phumza Maweni

 Nia Jones

 Adelaide Muskwe

Home venues
On 3 March 2017 Severn Stars made their home Netball Superleague debut with a 53–46 win against Celtic Dragons at the University of Worcester Arena. Severn Stars have also played home games at the University of Gloucestershire Arena

Coaches

Head coaches

Directors of netball

References

External links
 Severn Stars on Facebook
  Severn Stars on Twitter

 
Netball Superleague teams
Netball teams in England
Sport in Worcester, England
Sport in Gloucester
University of Worcester
University of Gloucestershire
2016 establishments in England
Sports clubs established in 2016